Marcelo Alejandro Alonso Claro (born 19 March 1969) is a Chilean actor and theater director.

Alonso has a degree in Acting from the Theater Department of the Faculty of Arts of the University of Chile. In 1994, he debuted in the Champaña television series on Channel 13, however they were only recurring appearances. In 2004 he joined the cast of the evening television series Los Pincheira, and since that year he has established himself as a stable actor within the television series of the Dramatic Area of TVN. Since 2015, he has starred in the productions La poseída, El camionero (2016) and Wena profe (2017). In theater, he has been part of the cast of "Casa de Muñecas" by Henrik Ibsen, "Pelo negro, boca arriba" by Rodrigo Bazaes and "Un Roble" by Tim Crouch, among other works; as theater director he has been in charge of the first version of "Las brutas" by Juan Radrigán and "Madame de Sade" by Yukio Mishima.

Filmography

Films

Telenovelas

References

1969 births
Living people
Chilean male film actors
Chilean male television actors
20th-century Chilean male actors
21st-century Chilean male actors
Fellows of the American Physical Society